Green Line 10 (extension) of the Mumbai Metro, also referred to as the Gaimukh-Shivaji Chowk (Mira Road) corridor, is part of the metro system for the city of Mumbai, India. This line is fully elevated.

In February 2017, the MMRDA announced that the DMRC was preparing a detailed project report (DPR) on Metro 10. Preliminary plans prepared jointly by MMRDA and DMRC.
The line will run parallel to Thane - Bhayandar Highway, and  will joint  with metro route no 9 at Chhatrapati Shivaji Maharaj Chowk. The project is estimated to cost ₹3,600 crore (US$530 million).

It will reduce the current travel time by between 50% and 75% depending on road conditions.

Construction
The Government of Maharashtra is keen to implement expeditiously the Master Plan Corridors recommended by DMRC on a fast track mode and to complete them in the next 3–4 years. To start with, it is decided to take up the task of updation of DPRs and also preparation of new DPRs for the following potential elevated metro corridors

1. Gauge (Nominal)::- 1435 mm

2. Route Length::-

3. Number of stations::- 4 (All Elevated)

4. Traffic Projection: :-
Extension from Gaimukh to Shivaji Chowk (Mira Road)

5. 
i. Design Speed 90 km/h

ii. Maximum Operating Speed 80 km/h

iii. Schedule Speed 35 km/h

6. Traction Power Supply: :-
a. Traction system voltage 25 kV AC

b. Current Collection Over Head Catenary

c. Receiving Sub Stations One near Kashimira/ Shivaji Chowk
(Mira Road)

7. Maintenance facilities: :-
No additional depot has been proposed for this extension. Same depot of Gaimukh to CSMT metro corridor, either at Owale or Gaimukh shall be used for this extension also after due augmentation.

8. Structure: :-

i. Elevated:
Station structure with viaduct columns supporting the concourse girders by a cantilever arm.

ii. Underground section with New Austrian Tunneling Method (NATM). For the small underground section running under the hills, New Austrian Tunneling Method (NATM) of underground construction can be employed.

9. Terminals :-
Since this is an extension of Gaimukh to CSMT metro corridor on Gaimukh end. Thus this section has only one terminal station as mentioned below:

Shivaji Chowk (Mira Road)
This is an elevated station. It is proposed parallel to proposed Kashigaon Station of Metro Line-9. Scissors cross overs are proposed at the rear end of this station. Scissors Crossovers will be provided at the terminal station viz. Shivaji Chowk (Mira Road) station.

10 Depot :-
No additional depot has been proposed for this extension. Same depot of Gaimukh to CSMT metro corridor, either at Owale or Gaimukh shall be used for this extension also after due augmentation.

Planning
The corridor will have four stations, all elevated. Some sections of the corridor are underground/below the hill. Almost all the stations are on the road stations.

The stations have been located so as to serve passenger requirements and to enable convenient integration with other modes of transport. Efforts have been made to propose station locations at a uniform inter-station distance as feasible. The average inter-station distance is ≈2 km, though it varies from 0.873 km to 4.34 km due to land-use and topographic reasons. The minimum inter-station distance is between Shivaji Chowk (Mira Road) Station and Kashimira Metro Station i.e. 872.941 m. The maximum inter-station distance is between Gaimukh Reti Bundar and Varsova Char Phata i.e. 4342.345 m.

Station Type

The stations have been planned with side platforms to avoid the viaduct structure from flaring in and out at stations, which obstructs the road traffic below. Care has been taken to locate stations in straight alignment. However, in some stations, site constraints have become the deciding criteria and a curve of 1000m radius has been introduced in the platform.

List of Stations

Train Operation Plan

The underlying operation philosophy is to take the MRT System more attractive and economical, the main features being:

 Selecting the most optimum frequency of Train services to meet sectional capacity
requirement during peak hours on most of the sections.

 Economical & optimum train service frequency not only during peak period but also
during the off-peak period.

 Optimization of the train's reliability for achieving the best possible availability online.

 A train consists of 6 coaches for the year 2021 which will be augmented to 8 coaches to
meet the future demand.

 Multi-tasking of train operation and maintenance staff.

Mumbai Metro Line 4 with Line 10 and Line 11 Extension plan:-

List of stations of Line-11 & Line-4 (CSMT to Gaimukh) and Line-10 (Gaimukh to Shivaji Chowk (Mira Road)) which is the extension of Mumbai Metro is given below: -

The car depot will be located at either at Owale or Gaimukh shall be used for this extension of Metro Line 10, Line 11 and Line 4.

Stations
Line 10 connects Gaimukh in Thane to Shivaji Chowk in Mira road. The line covers four stations in 9.2 kilometers and will be running on elevated stations. The stations on this line include

This line is expected to cost Rs. 4,476 crore. This line will also connect Borivali, Mira-Bhayander, Thane, and rest of Mumbai.

References

Mumbai Metro lines